Jacques Masdeu-Arus (7 August 1942 – 4 November 2018) was a member of the National Assembly of France.  He represented the Yvelines department, and was a member of the Union for a Popular Movement.

Biography
After an early career as an engineer, Jacques Masdeu-Arus became a councillor of Poissy in 1981 under Mayor Joseph Tréhel. Masdeu-Arus would succeed Tréhel as mayor after the municipal elections of 1983. He was also on the General Council of Yvelines from 1982 to 1988.

Following Robert Wagner's death in 1988, Masdeu-Arus became a member of the 12th constituency of Yvelines. He served until 2009, when the constituency was ended by the Constitutional Council.

In 2004, Masdeu-Arus supported a bill for the death penalty for terrorists, but voted against the death penalty in 2007. In the National Assembly, he was a member of the Study of Tibet Committee.

References

1942 births
2018 deaths
Politicians from Paris
Rally for the Republic politicians
Union for a Popular Movement politicians
Deputies of the 8th National Assembly of the French Fifth Republic
Deputies of the 9th National Assembly of the French Fifth Republic
Deputies of the 10th National Assembly of the French Fifth Republic
Deputies of the 11th National Assembly of the French Fifth Republic
Deputies of the 12th National Assembly of the French Fifth Republic
Deputies of the 13th National Assembly of the French Fifth Republic